Tomb KV48 is an ancient Egyptian tomb located in the Valley of the Kings in Egypt. It was discovered in 1906 by Edward R. Ayrton excavating on behalf of Theodore M. Davis, and contained the robbed burial of the Eighteenth Dynasty noble Amenemipet called Pairy.

Location, discovery, and contents
The tomb is located to the west of the animal tombs KV51 and KV52, on the southern side of the wadi that leads towards KV35, the tomb of Amenhotep II.

The walls were not plastered or smoothed.

The unwrapped and broken mummy of the owner of the tomb was found thrown to one side; Ayrton describes him as "tall and well-built." The presence of three inscribed mud bricks wrapped in resin-coated fabric and fragments of a fourth (so-called magical bricks), along with a number of wooden ushabti allowed him to be identified as the vizier and mayor of Thebes, Amenemipet.

Re-investigation
The tomb was part of the Pacific Lutheran University Valley of the Kings expedition’s work in 2009. The expedition was led by Dr. Don Ryan. The tomb was recorded and excavated. It is awaiting publication.

References

External links
Theban Mapping Project: KV48 includes detailed maps of most of the tombs.

1906 archaeological discoveries
Valley of the Kings